Back for More may refer to:

 Back for More (Natalia album), a 2004 album by Belgian singer Natalia
 Back for More Live, a 2005 concert DVD by Natalia
 Back for More (Shawn Desman album), a 2005 album by Canadian singer Shawn Desman
 "Back for More" (Five Finger Death Punch song), a 2011 song by American heavy metal band Five Finger Death Punch
 "Back for More" (Glenn Lewis song), a 2003 R&B/hip-hop song by Glenn Lewis
 "Back for More", a heavy metal song by Ratt from the 1984 album Out of the Cellar
 Back 4 More, a proposed title for the video game Left 4 Dead 2
 "Back For More", a 2001 song by A-Teens
 Back For More, a Five Nights at Freddy's-inspired computer game by Nexagonal

See also
 Come Back for More, a 1958 novel by Al Fray
 Sometimes They Come Back... for More, a 1999 film by Daniel Zelik Berk